Anticleora is a genus of moths in the family Geometridae. It was described by Claude Herbulot in 1966.

References

Ennominae
Geometridae genera
Taxa named by Claude Herbulot